Jennifer Nelson may refer to:

 Jennifer Nelson (artist), American artist
 Jennifer Nelson (filmmaker), American documentary filmmaker
 Jennifer Yuh Nelson (born 1972), American director and storyboard artist
 Jenny Nelson, professor of physics